This is a list of fellows of the Royal Society elected in 1904.

Fellows
Charles Jasper Joly (1864–1906)
Hugh Marshall (1868–1913)
Donald Alexander Smith Baron Strathcona and Mount Royal (1820–1914)
Thomas Gregor Brodie (1866–1916)
Alexander Muirhead (1848–1920)
Sir James Johnston Dobbie (1852–1924)
Sir Arthur Everett Shipley (1861–1927)
Harold William Taylor Wager (1862–1929)
Alfred Cardew Dixon (1865–1936)
George Henry Falkiner Nuttall (1862–1937)
Edward Meyrick (1854–1938)
Sir Sidney Gerald Burrard (1860–1943)
William Whitehead Watts (1860–1947)
Sir Thomas Henry Holland (1868–1947)
Sir Gilbert Thomas Walker (1868–1958)
Morris William Travers (1872–1961)

References

1904
1904 in the United Kingdom
1904 in science